George Dunne Cameron Hosking OBE (born 27 December 1943 in Bowmore, in the Hebridean island of Islay) is a British Quaker, economist, accountant, psychologist, and clinical criminologist who founded WAVE Trust in 1996.

Education 
He graduated with an Honours M.A. degree in Political Economy with Economic History from Glasgow University in 1966; qualified as a Chartered Management Accountant in 1969 (later becoming a Fellow of the Chartered Institute of Management Accountants, FCMA); graduated with a First Class Honours B.Sc. degree in Psychology from Birkbeck College, London University, in 1983; with a PG Diploma in Clinical Criminology from Birmingham University in 1998; and with an Advanced PG Diploma in the Management of Psychological Trauma from Nottingham Trent University in 2000.

Career
Hosking has been successful in taking WAVE Trust from a small organization chatting about how to tackle the root causes of violence in internet chat rooms, to being WAVE adviser to the UK Home Office, Prime Minister's Strategy Unit, Metropolitan Police, Centre for Social Justice and Scottish Violence Reduction Unit on violence reduction. The World Health Organization have commended WAVE’s groundbreaking work and WAVE has become part of WHO’s global Violence Prevention Alliance

Hosking has looked at how to tackle violence at it roots by identifying and understanding root causes, rather than operating on symptoms. His consultancy has helped transform profitability for well-known international companies.

Hosking has been doing therapeutic work with violent criminals both in prison and after release. To date none of his clients have re-offended with violence, in or out of prison.

Hosking was appointed Officer of the Order of the British Empire (OBE) in the 2014 Birthday Honours for services to reducing violence, particularly child abuse.

References

1943 births
Living people
Alumni of the University of Birmingham
British accountants
British criminologists
British economists
British psychologists
British Quakers
Officers of the Order of the British Empire